= Theodos Anev =

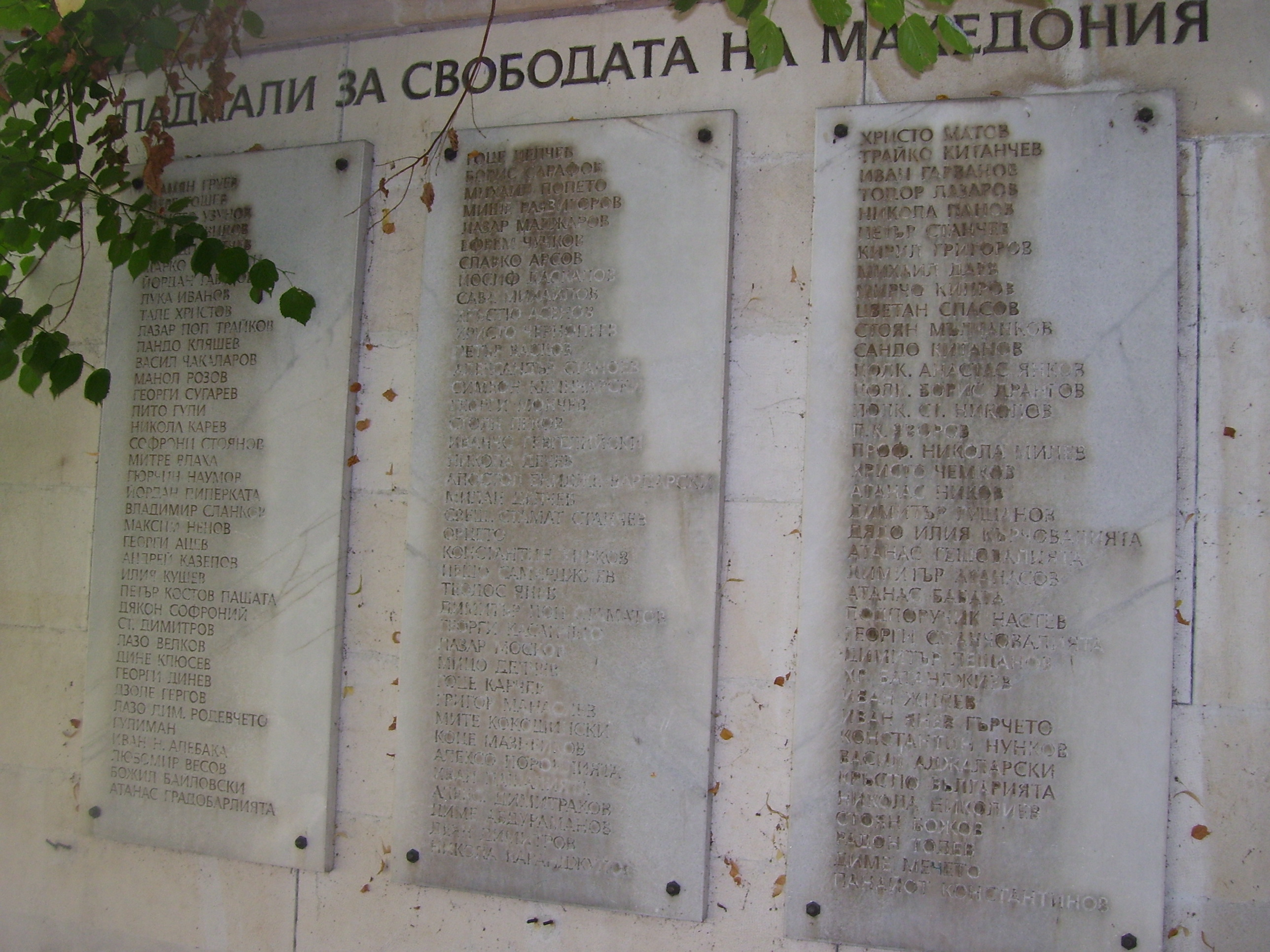
Alexandrov's monument in Kyustendil back

Teodos Anev or Yanev was a Bulgarian revolutionary and an activist of the Internal Macedonian Revolutionary Organization.

== Biography ==
Teodos Yanev was born in the Kumanovo village of Malino, then in the Ottoman Empire. He joined the IMRO. During the Balkan War in 1912, he was a volunteer in the Macedonian-Edirne militia and served in the Combined Partisan Company of the IOC and 14 water companies. During the First World War he was in the ranks of the partisan detachment of the 11th Division.

He died on September 14, 1915.
